Poetry of the Deed is the third studio album by London-based singer-songwriter Frank Turner, released on 7 September 2009. The album was released on Xtra Mile Recordings in the UK and Epitaph Records worldwide.

Unlike Turner's previous solo albums, Poetry of the Deed was rehearsed, arranged and recorded with his full band. In the album's liner notes, Turner states: "this album has been more of a collaborative process than on previous efforts, so first and foremost thanks are due to Ben Lloyd, Matt Nasir, Tarrant Anderson and Nigel Powell."

Background 
After extensive touring behind the release of Love, Ire & Song in 2008, Turner began writing new material, with a few songs ("Live Fast, Die Old" & "Dan's Song") appearing at gigs in late 2008.

Before recording the album, Turner and his band played four gigs in Oxford in order to road-test 14 new songs. Turner kept fans up to date during the writing and recording of the album via his blog.

The album was produced by Alex Newport. Recording took place at Leeders Farm in Norwich and the producer's own Future Shock Studio in Brooklyn, New York City.

The album's first single was "The Road" which received the status as 'Hottest Record in the World Today' by BBC Radio 1's Zane Lowe on 14 July 2009. The title track, "Poetry of the Deed," was released as its second single.

The iTunes deluxe version of the album includes four bonus acoustic tracks along with the music video for "The Road".

Track listing

Personnel

Musicians
Frank Turner - vocals, acoustic guitar, harmonica
Ben Lloyd - electric guitar, mandolin, vocals
Tarrant Anderson - bass guitar
Matt Nasir - piano, organ, keyboards, vocals
Nigel Powell - drums, percussion, vocals
Anna Jenkins - fiddle ("Sons of Liberty")
Marika Hughes - cello ("Faithful Son", "Our Lady of the Campfires")
Fergus Coulbeck - accordion ("Sons of Liberty")

Recording personnel
Alex Newport - producer, engineer, mixing
Dean Curtis - studio assistant
Chris Tabron - mixing assistant
Frank Arkwright - mastering

Artwork
Chris Bourke - lino-cut
Alex Newport - band photograph
Graham Smith - solo photograph
Ben Morse - live band photograph

References

2009 albums
Frank Turner albums
Epitaph Records albums
Xtra Mile Recordings albums
Albums produced by Alex Newport